Straumøya is an island in the municipality of Bodø in Nordland county, Norway.  The  island is located on the south side of the Saltfjorden, just west of the Saltstraumen strait.  The island is connected to the mainland by the Indre Sunnan Bridge and to the nearby Knaplundsøya island by the Saltstraumen Bridge, both bridges are a part of Norwegian County Road 17.  In 2016, the island had 278 residents.

The island has the Seinesodden Nature Reserve and the village of Seines with its associated surfing spot.

See also
List of islands of Norway

References

Bodø
Islands of Nordland